A Landscape of Lies is a 2011 British drama film, written and directed by Paul Knight. The film stars Andrea McLean, Danny Midwinter, Lucinda Rhodes-Flaherty, Daniel Peacock, Marc Bannerman, Andre Samson and Christina Baily. It was shown at the Las Vegas Film Festival

A Landscape of Lies received media attention after it was discovered that the film concept was first created as, and was subsequently filmed in an attempt to hide, a hoax by a criminal group to commit tax fraud. It won a Silver Ace Award at the Las Vegas Film Festival, which was later rescinded after the festival committee learned of the film's use in the tax scam.

Synopsis

Gulf war veteran Jacob (Andre Samson) finds it hard to adjust to life after returning home, but has found solace in his friend Hilt (Marc Bannerman), who was also Jacob's commanding officer. However, after Hilt is murdered by a would-be thief, Jacob decides to investigate what happened in order to bring peace to both his life and to Hilt's widow. As Jacob begins his investigation he finds himself becoming embroiled in a complicated series of events where nothing is as it seems.

Cast

 Andrea McLean as Dr Audrey Grey
 Lucinda Rhodes-Flaherty as Claire
 Marc Bannerman as Hilt
 Daniel Peacock as Welles
 Kelly George as DC Carter
 Christina Baily as Suzy
 Helen Latham as Alice
 Danny Young as Eion
 Danny Midwinter as Brannigan
 Philip Brodie as Marcus
 Andre Samson as Jacob
 Victoria Hopkins as Tess
 Mel Mills as DCI Lane
 Rosie Ginger as Hannah
 Maeve Madden as Melody
 Anna Passey as Sergeant Egan
 Robby Haynes as Lieutenant Hayes
 Alana Arthurs as Sullings

Production

A Landscape of Lives
Prior to the film's final incarnation as A Landscape of Lies, it was initially titled A Landscape of Lives. The projected script followed a "crooked property developer", "SAS bodyguards that got killed by a gay brother", and was described by Knight as being "a crime thriller [that had] no real thrills". Knight was brought on to finish the script for A Landscape of Lives after answering a job offer to re-write the script for an animated Robin Hood film. Unaware of Al-Issa, Madden, Hassan, and Al Baghdady's intent, the group asked Knight to also look at the script for A Landscape of Lives, to which Knight agreed. The film was to be part of a film contract that would have the group's film company funding Knight's next five film projects along with the A Landscape of Lives and Robin Hood films. Over the next few days Knight was asked to re-write and then film the completed script, which would become A Landscape of Lies.

Filming for A Landscape of Lies took place in the United Kingdom over a six-week period during 2011. Aoife Madden was set to produce the movie, which would be the acting debut of Scottish TV presenter Andrea McLean. A Landscape of Lies was released in 2011 and was screened at the 2012 Las Vegas Film Festival, where it received a "Silver Ace". This award was later rescinded after it was discovered that the film was a front for tax fraud.

Tax issues
On 14 March 2013 it was reported that the film was actually at the center of a plot to defraud the British government of millions of pounds in tax relief, in particular, claiming tax relief and VAT relief on a massively loss-making film, to the tune of £1.5 million in VAT relief, and £1.3 million in film-related tax relief. The lead actors McLean and Bannerman and director Knight were unaware of the crime. The persons involved in the crime were Bashar Al-Issa, Aoife Madden, Tariq Hassan, and Osama Al Baghdady. They were brought to trial and convicted on 13 March 2013 along with Ian Sherwood, who allowed the gang to use his offices. The gang had not intended to actually film the movie and had tried to deter attention by writing several scripts and beginning pre-production work, but eventually began filming after receiving negative attention from investigators. They also utilized false receipts and several fake companies, through which they received £796,000 of public money. The gang was sentenced on 25 March 2013. Al-Issa was sentenced to six and a half years while the others received lesser sentences between three and five years.

Bloomberg, along with several other news outlets, compared the film and the criminal charges to Ben Affleck's Academy Award-winning film Argo.

References

External links
 
  as archived 25 January 2013 at Wayback Machine

2011 films
British drama films
2011 drama films
2010s English-language films
2010s British films